USS LST-716 was an  in the United States Navy during World War II. She was transferred to the Republic of China Navy as ROCS Chung Chien (LST-205).

Construction and career 
LST-716 was laid down on 16 June 1944 at Jeffersonville Boat & Machine Co., Jeffersonville, Indiana. Launched on 24 July 1944 and commissioned on 18 August 1944.

Service in the United States Navy 
During World War II, LST-716 was assigned to the Asiatic-Pacific theater and participated in the assault and occupation of Iwo Jima from 19 to 26 February and Okinawa Gunto from 2 May and 30 June 1945. Following the war, LST-716 performed occupation duty in the Far East until mid-September 1945. She returned to the United States and was decommissioned and transferred to United States Army on 12 June 1946. 

Under the Lend-Lease Act, she was transferred to the Republic of China on 7 February 1948, and served the ROC navy as Chung Chien (LST-205).

LST-716 earned two battle star for World War II service.

Service in the Republic of China Navy 
On 1 June 2018, ROCS Chung Jian and ROCS Chong He conducted a training maneuver.

Gallery

External links 

 Photo Gallery-15 July 2017
 Navsource.org

References

LST-542-class tank landing ships
1944 ships
Ships transferred from the United States Navy to the Republic of China Navy
World War II amphibious warfare vessels of the United States